The 1908 South Carolina Gamecocks football team represented the University of South Carolina as an independent during the 1908 college football season. Led by third-year head coach Christie Benet, South Carolina compiled a record of 3–5–1.

Schedule

References

South Carolina
South Carolina Gamecocks football seasons
South Carolina Gamecocks football